The Davis Joint Unified School District is the school district for the city of Davis, California. The adjacent town of El Macero is also within the District. On July 1, 2016, John Bowes, who served mostly recently as Assistant Superintendent of Human Resources for the Palos Verdes Peninsula Unified School District, will begin his appointment as superintendent.

Elementary schools
The elementary schools in the DJUSD are:
Birch Lane Elementary
Cesar Chavez Elementary
Fairfield Elementary
Fred T. Korematsu Elementary
Marguerite Montgomery Elementary
North Davis Elementary
Patwin Elementary
Pioneer Elementary
Willett Elementary
Davis School for Independent Study

Junior Highs
The Junior Highs in the DJUSD are:
Da Vinci Academy Junior High
Emerson Junior High
Harper Junior High
Holmes Junior High
Davis School for Independent Study

High schools
Da Vinci Charter Academy
Davis Senior High School
Martin Luther King, Jr High School
Davis School for Independent Study

Other
Davis Adult and Community Education
Children's Center Preschool

References

External links
DJUSD
DavisWiki article

School districts in Yolo County, California